The following is a list of car models currently for sale in Argentina.

BMW
1 Series
3 Series
5 Series
6 Series
X3
X5
X6

Coradir
TITA
TITO

Ford
 F100
 Falcon
 Fairlane
 Taunus
 Taurus
 Laser
 Econoline
 Mustang
 Capri
 Granada
 Granada (europe)
 Aerostar
 Sierra
 Escort
 Orion
 Pampa
 Corcel
 Galaxy
 Galaxy (Versailles)
 Ka
 Fiesta
 Focus
 Mondeo
 EcoSport
 Escape
 Kuga
 S-Max
 Explorer
 Ranger
 Courier
 Transit

American motors corporation 

Ambassador
Rambler 
Spirit
Eagle
Pacer
Concord

General Motors

Chevrolet
 400
 Chevy
 Corsa
 Corsa Combo
 Corsa II
 Classic
 Citation
 Montana
 Celta
 Prisma
 Agile
 Meriva
 Astra
 Zafira
 Cruze
 Vectra
 Grand Vitara
 Grand Blazer
 S-10
 Monza
 LUV
Malibu
 C-20/D-20
 Camaro
 Corvette
 Corsica
 Beretta
 Lumina APV
 Veraneio
 Trailblazer

Honda
 Fit
 City
 Civic
 Accord
 Prelude
 HRV
 CRV
 Pilot 
 Acty

Kia Motors
Picanto
Cerato
Rondo
Magentis
Opirus
Sportage
Sorento
Combi

Mohave
Sedona
Pride
Rio
Sephia
Capital
Avella

Land Rover
Defender
Discovery

Daihatsu 

Charade
Terios
Sirion
 Cuore
 Rocky
 Feroza
 Hijet
 Wide 55
 Taft 
 Applause 
Max cuore
Charmant
Move

Subaru 

Legacy
Outback
Forester
Justy
Brat
1600
600
Impreza
XV

Mercedes-Benz
 A-Class
 B-Class
 C-Class
 E-Class
 S-Class
 GLK
 ML
 Sprinter

Mitsubishi
 Colt
 Lancer
 Galant
 Celeste 
 Sapporo
 Outlander Sport
 Space Wagon 
 Canter 
 3000 GTO 
 Eclipse 

 Outlander
 Montero
 L100
 L200
 L300

Nissan
 March
 Tiida
 720
 D21
 Quest
Vanette
 Sentra
 Bluebird 
 280Z
 Silvia
 370Z
 Laurel
 Teana
 Maxima
 Murano
 X-Trail
 X-Terra
 Terrano
 Pathfinder
 Patrol
 NP300
 Frontier

Renault
 Dauphine
 Gordini
 4
 5
 6
 9/11
 12
 18
 19
 20
 21
 25
 30
 Fuego
 Torino
 Twingo
 Clio
 Sandero
 Logan
 Symbol
 Mégane
 Scénic
 Laguna
 Fluence
 Latitude
 Express
 Kangoo
 Duster
 Koleos
 Trafic
 Rodeo
 Master

Sero electric
Sero Cargo
Sero Sedan

Stellantis

Alfa Romeo
Alfasud
Giulietta
Alfetta
GTV
Spider
33
145
146
147
155
156
159
164
Mito
4C
8C

Chrysler
Valiant
Neon
Stratus
Caravan
Sebring 
PT Cruiser
Shadow
Crossfire
300M
300

Citroën
 2CV
 3CV
 Ami 8
 Méhari
 Dyane
 Visa
 GSA
 CX
 AX
 ZX
 Saxo
 Xsara
 Xsara Picasso
 Xantia
 C3
 C3 Picasso
 C4
 C4 Picasso
 C4 Grand Picasso
 C5
 C6
 DS3
 C15
 Berlingo

Dodge
1500
Polara
Dakota
Journey
Spirit
Neon

Fiat
 600
 770
 800
 1100
 1500
 1500 Coupe
 1600
 1600 Coupe
 125
 128
 128 Europa
 128 Super Europa
 133
 147
 147 Spazio
 147 Brio
 147 Vivace
 Uno
 Duna
 Regatta
 Fiorino
 Palio
 Siena
 Tipo
 Tempra
 Marea
 Barchetta
 Brava
 500
 Nuevo Uno
 Punto
 Linea
 Idea
 Strada
 Qubo
 Ducato

Jeep
Willys Overland
Willys Estanciera
Compass
Cherokee
Grand Cherokee
Liberty
Patriot
Wrangler
Commander

Opel
 K 180
 Rekord
 Astra
 Vectra
 Calibra

Peugeot
 403
 404
 504
 604
 205
 305
 405
 505
 605
 106
 206
 306
 406
 207 Compact
 207
 307
 407
 607
 308
 408
 3008
 5008
 RCZ
 Hoggar
 Partner
 Expert
 Boxer

Suzuki
 Cervo
 Alto
 Fun
 Swift
 Baleno
 LJ80
 Jimny
 Samurai
 Vitara
 Grand Vitara
 Grand Vitara JIII
 Carry

Toyota
 Corolla
 Prius
 Carina
 Celica
 Yaris
 Etios
 Corona
 Avensis
 Camry
 Cressida
 RAV4
 4Runner
 Hilux
 Hilux SW4
 Land Cruiser
 Land Cruiser Prado
 FJ Cruiser
 LiteAce
 GR86
 C-HR
 Coaster  
 Starlet  
Crown
tiara
 Hiace
 Previa

Volkswagen

Audi
80
100
200
A1
A3
A3 Sportback
A4
A5
A6
A4
RS4
S3
S5
Q5
Q7
TT
R8

Volkswagen
 Beetle
 Brasília
 1500
 Passat
 Kombi
 Gacel
 Senda
 Carat
 Gol
 Santana/Quantum
 Polo Classic
 Golf
 Bora
 Caddy
 New Beetle
 Fox
 CrossFox
 Suran
 Voyage
 Vento
 Passat CC
 Scirocco
 Saveiro
 Sharan
 Tiguan
 Touareg
 Transporter
 T4 Multivan

Volkswagen's Gacel, Senda, Fox, Saveiro, Suran and Voyage are based on Volkswagen Gol platforms

VOLT Motors
e1
w1
z1

References

External links
 USAutoTeam.org Cars sold in Argentina

Car models
Argentina
Cars
Cars of Argentina
Car